Centro Deportivo Bezana is a Spanish football team based in Santa Cruz de Bezana, in the autonomous community of Cantabria. Founded in 1970 it plays in Tercera División – Group 3, holding home games at Campo de Fútbol Municipal de Bezana, which has a capacity of 3,500 spectators.

History
In the 2018-19 season the club finished close to the top of the Tercera División, Group 3, in the 6th position among 20 teams.

Season to season

27 seasons in Tercera División

References

External links
Official website 
Futbolme team profile 
Fútbol de Cantabria team profile 

Football clubs in Cantabria
Association football clubs established in 1970
1970 establishments in Spain